The Captive Air Amphibious Transporter (CAAT) is a 1:5 scale tracked amphibious vehicle prototype being developed by DARPA. It drives on the water with air-filled pontoons attached to the tracks, and is intended to demonstrate how to transport standard 20- or 40-foot containers from ordinary container ships to shore without using a harbor. DARPA is investigating its usefulness in disasters so that commercial shipping can relieve military ships to focus on military tasks. The CAAT is one of four elements in the Tactically Expandable Maritime Platform (TEMP) program; the others being a containerized living quarter, a stabilized crane, and an unmanned powered parachute delivering containers by air.

UHAC

The Marine Corps Warfighting Laboratory is using the CAAT's air-filled track system in its Ultra Heavy-Lift Amphibious Connector (UHAC) concept. The objective is to develop a new amphibious connector to transport U.S. Marine Corps vehicles from ship to shore in heavier loads and over shore obstacles. The demonstrator was 42 ft (13 m) long, 26 ft (8 m) wide, 17 ft (5 m) high, weighed 38 tons, and traveled at 4-5 knots on water; the hull was made of aluminum, with a small pilothouse mounted on the bow. Using track feet fitted with dense air-impregnated foam blocks make it buoyant in the water and propel it on land, allowing it to traverse through mud, sand, and marshland when ashore. This made the demonstrator's ground pressure about 1 PSI, compared to 9.7 PSI for the Amphibious Assault Vehicle. The UHAC is primarily aimed at potentially replacing the Landing Craft Air Cushion hovercraft, but it could also supplement it and replace the Landing Craft Utility. The UHAC would be faster on water than the AAV and could even transport them to get closer to shore, or carry up to three M1 Abrams tanks. A production version would be survivable with a lower profile, armor, and armament. The concept for the UHAC began in 2008 with the goal to design an amphibious vehicle with low PSI. The Office of Naval Research accepted the design from Navatek, and three prototypes have been constructed since (a one-fifth scale model, a one-quarter scale model, and the half-scale model). Currently, the UHAC effort is a collaborative effort between the U.S. ONR and the Singapore Ministry of Defense Science and Technology department. No decision has been made on taking the final steps necessary to produce the full-scale version.

References

This article incorporates work from https://www.fbo.gov/index?s=opportunity&mode=form&id=84b2ca1784dda86b61f606897097e3cc&tab=core&_cview=0, which is in the public domain as it is a work of the United States Army.

External links
Meet the Marines’ Ultra Heavy-lift Amphibious Connector

Tracked amphibious vehicles
Humanitarian aid
DARPA vehicles
DARPA projects
Experimental vehicles